Kushtrim Lushtaku (born 8 October 1989) is a Kosovan professional footballer and manager who plays as an attacking midfielder and acts as a player-manager for Türkspor Neckarsulm.

Early life
Lushtaku was born in Skenderaj, SFR Yugoslavia but raised in Heilbronn, Germany.

Club career
He began his career with TG Offenau. After four years there, he joined FSV Bad Friedrichshall in summer 1998. He played for FSV Bad Friedrichshall for only one year. In July 1999, he signed for VfR Heilbronn and moved after two years to city rival FC Heilbronn. Lushtaku played for five years for FC Heilbronn before joining TSG Backnang 1919 in summer 2006. After two successful years with TSG Backnang 1919 Lushtaku signed his first professional contract in the newly formed Kosovar Superliga for KF Drenica. In his first professional season he played 25 games, scored nine goals and rendered fifteen assists for his club.

1860 München
In summer 2009, he left KF Drenica and signed a four-year contract with TSV 1860 München, on 30 July 2009.

Örebro
On 1 March 2011, Lushtaku signed with Allsvenskan team Örebro. He made his competitive debut on 21 April by playing full-90 minutes as Örebro defeated 2–1 Häcken. His first goal came later on 13 June in the match against Trelleborgs, where Lushtaku scored in the last moments of the match as Örebro won 4–2.

Kukësi
On 18 June 2014, Lushtaku completed a transfer as a free agent to Albanian Superliga side Kukësi by penning a one-year contract.

Flamurtari Vlorë
On 31 August 2016, Lushtaku joined Flamurtari Vlorë on the deadline day by signing a one-year contract with an option of a further one.

Return to Kukësi
On 1 September 2016, Lushtaku rejoined Kukësi as a free agent, signing a contract for the 2016–17 season. He made his return debut on 28 September 2016 by playing full-90 minutes in Kukësi 0–3 away defeat of Tomori Berat valid for the first leg of 2016–17 Albanian Cup first round. His first league appearance came on matchday 9 against Luftëtari Gjirokastër where he played in the last 11 minutes of a 1–0 home win thanks to an Izair Emini winner. Lushtaku's first score-sheet contributions came later on 21 November in the match against Teuta Durrës, where he came as a substitute to score the winner in the last minutes of the match. His first match as starter came on matchday 16 where Kukësi stumbled into a 1–1 away draw against Korabi Peshkopi, with Lushtaku scoring his team's only goal.

Lushtaku's second part of season didn't go as expected, as he did not break through Ernest Gjoka's lineup, finishing the season with 19 league appearances, which only two of them were as starter, collecting 442 minutes as Kukësi won its maiden Albanian Superliga title. He also made 5 cup appearances, all of them as starter, as Kukësi were eliminated in quarter-finals by Tirana. On 29 May 2017, not happy with the playing time he was receiving, Lushtaku left the club by terminating his contract.

Trepça'89
On 5 June 2017. Lushtaku joined with Football Superleague of Kosovo champions Trepça'89.

1. CfR Pforzheim
On 1 October 2017. Lushtaku joined Oberliga Baden-Württemberg side 1. CfR Pforzheim. On 7 October 2017, he made his debut in a 0–2 home defeat against Bahlinger SC after being named in the starting line-up.

Türkspor Neckarsulm
At the beginning of August 2019, Lushtaku joined Bezirksliga side Türkspor Neckarsulm, he made his debut on 25 August against FV Wüstenrot after being named in the starting line-up and scored his side's second goal during a 4–1 home win. At the beginning of September 2019, Lushtaku appointed as player-manager and on 12 September, he had his first match as Türkspor Neckarsulm player-manager in a 2–1 away defeat against Aramäer Heilbronn.

International career

Under-21

Senior
On 7 September 2014. Lushtaku making his debut with Kosovo in a friendly match against Oman after coming on as a substitute at 72nd minute in place of Shpëtim Hasani.

Honours
Fortuna Köln
Regionalliga West: 2013–14

Kukësi
Albanian Superliga: 2016–17

Individual
Albanian Superliga Player of the Month: November 2014

References

External links

1989 births
Living people
Sportspeople from Skenderaj
Kosovan emigrants to Germany
Association football midfielders
German footballers
Kosovan footballers
Kosovo under-21 international footballers
Kosovo international footballers
KF Drenica players
TSV 1860 Munich II players
Örebro SK players
SC Fortuna Köln players
FK Kukësi players
Flamurtari Vlorë players
KF Trepça'89 players
Allsvenskan players
Kategoria Superiore players
Regionalliga players
Kosovan expatriate footballers
Expatriate footballers in Germany
Kosovan expatriate sportspeople in Germany
Expatriate footballers in Sweden
Kosovan expatriate sportspeople in Sweden
Expatriate footballers in Albania
Kosovan expatriate sportspeople in Albania